The 1894 Boston Beaneaters season was the 24th season of the franchise. The team finished in third place in the National League with a record of 83–49, 8 games behind the Baltimore Orioles.  They hold the MLB record for most runs scored in a single season by one team with 1,220, a stunning 9.24 runs per contest.

Regular season 
The Beaneaters' home park, the South End Grounds, was destroyed in a fire on May 15. The team played their home games at Congress Street Grounds until the rebuilt park opened on July 20.

Season standings

Record vs. opponents

Roster

Player stats

Batting

Starters by position 
Note: Pos = Position; G = Games played; AB = At bats; H = Hits; Avg. = Batting average; HR = Home runs; RBI = Runs batted in

Other batters 
Note: G = Games played; AB = At bats; H = Hits; Avg. = Batting average; HR = Home runs; RBI = Runs batted in

Pitching

Starting pitchers 
Note: G = Games pitched; IP = Innings pitched; W = Wins; L = Losses; ERA = Earned run average; SO = Strikeouts

Other pitchers 
Note: G = Games pitched; IP = Innings pitched; W = Wins; L = Losses; ERA = Earned run average; SO = Strikeouts

Relief pitchers 
Note: G = Games pitched; W = Wins; L = Losses; SV = Saves; ERA = Earned run average; SO = Strikeouts

Awards and honors
Hugh Duffy, Major League Baseball record, highest single-season batting average (.440)

Notes

References 
1894 Boston Beaneaters season at Baseball Reference

Boston Beaneaters seasons
Boston Beaneaters
Boston Beaneaters
19th century in Boston